Lussac may refer to the following places in France:

Lussac, Charente, a commune in the department of Charente
Lussac, Charente-Maritime, a commune in the department of Charente-Maritime
Lussac, Gironde, a commune in the department of Gironde
Lussac-les-Châteaux, a commune in the department of Vienne
Lussac-les-Églises, a commune in the department of Haute-Vienne